Ŭ or ŭ is a letter in the Esperanto alphabet, based on u. It is also used in the Belarusian language, when written in the 20th-century form of the Belarusian Latin alphabet, and formerly in the Romanian alphabet. The accent mark (diacritic) is known as a breve.

It looks similar to an italic form of a Short I.

Belarusian

The letter ŭ is called non-syllabic u (romanised: u nieskładovaje) in Belarusian because it resembles the vowel u but forms no syllables. Its Cyrillic counterpart is ў. Sometimes (as in National Geographic atlases), the Cyrillic letter ў is Romanized as w.

The letter ŭ was proposed by Alexander Rypinski in 1840. For lack of the corresponding type, his book Białoruś. Kilka słów o poezji prostego ludu tej naszej polskiej prowincji, o jego muzyce, śpiewie, tańcach was printed with û in Belarusian citations instead, but it was explained that the proper letter was u with Latin brevis. The proper letter ŭ was first used in printing in 1853, in Rypinski's poem Niaczyścik.

Esperanto

Ŭ represents a semivowel in the orthography of Esperanto, which is an international auxiliary language publicly presented in 1887. As in Belarusian, Esperanto Ŭ is pronounced as a non-syllabic , primarily in the diphthongs aŭ, eŭ and rarely oŭ.

It is thought that ŭ was created by analogy with the Belarusian letter ў (Cyrillic u with breve), which was proposed by P.A. Bessonov in 1870. It may also be considered that the placement of the breve above a vowel letter to turn it into an equivalent semivowel was inspired by the use thereof on the Cyrillic letter й, representing /j/ and formed by placing a breve over the letter и, used most commonly to represent /i/.

Ŭ may also be used for [w] in foreign names, such as Ŭaŝingtono for "Washington", although it usually is written with v (Vaŝingtono). It is also used for [w] in onomatopoeias, as in ŭa! "waa!", and uniquely in one native lexical word, ŭo, which is the Esperanto name of the letter ŭ itself.

Romanian

Ŭ was previously part of the Romanian alphabet. U with breve was used only in the ending of a word. It was essentially a Latin equivalent of the Slavonic back yer found in languages like Russian. Unpronounced in most cases, it served to indicate that the previous consonant was not palatalized, or that the preceding i was the vowel [i] and not a mere marker of palatalization. When ŭ was pronounced, it would follow a stressed vowel and stand in for semivowel u, as in words eŭ, aŭ, and meŭ, all spelled today without the breve. Once frequent, it survives today in author Mateiu Caragiale's name – originally spelled Mateiŭ (it is not specified whether the pronunciation should adopt a version that he himself probably never used, while in many editions he is still credited as Matei). In other names, only the breve was dropped, while preserving the pronunciation of a semivowel u, as is the case of B.P. Hasdeŭ.

Romanization of Indic scripts

When transcribing Malayalam texts into ISO 15919, usually the final glottal-stop is transcribed as 'ŭ', an epenthetic vowel (a rule called as ). In Tamil, any wordfinal-'u' is always a short-vowel, hence transcribing it as 'ŭ' (a rule called as ). The Kashmiri vowel / is also sometimes transcribed as 'ŭ'.

Other uses
In some philological transcriptions of Latin, "ŭ" denotes a short U — for example, "fŭgō" (to chase away), vs "fūmō" (to smoke).

The letter is also commonly used among Slavists to denote the short back closed vowel of Proto-Slavic.

The McCune–Reischauer Romanization of Korean uses "ŭ" to signify the close back unrounded vowel in 으.

Several schemes for pronunciation of English words have used "ŭ".

In Kurrentschrift, an outdated script used in German handwriting, the lower-case letter "u" is adorned with a breve to distinguish it from the otherwise identical letter "n". The script was used for teaching writing in schools; the last variant, known as Sütterlinschrift, as late as 1941. The ingrained habit of writing "ŭ" for "u" persisted for a long time even as people switched to cursive scripts with easily distinguishable shapes for "u" and "n", occasionally leading to confusion between "ŭ" (meaning "u") and "ü" among later generations not brought up with this tick.

See also
 Esperanto orthography
 Short U (Ў) used in Belarusian and Uzbek Cyrillic alphabet
 Breve
 Short I (Й)
 Ĉ
 Ĝ
 Ĥ
 Ĵ
 Ŝ

Notes

Belarusian language
Esperanto letters with diacritics
Romanian language
Latin letters with diacritics
U breve